Markku Tuokko (24 June 1951 – 20 February 2015) was a Finnish discus thrower, shot putter and teacher.

At the 1978 European Championships, Tuokko won the silver medal in discus with a result of 64.90 metres. At the 1980 Summer Olympics in Moscow, he finished ninth. In Montreal 1976 he didn't make it past the qualifying round.  At the 1979 European Indoor Championships, he was fourth in shot put.

He won the Finnish discus throw championship five times (1977 and 1979–1982). His personal best in discus throw was 68.12 metres, achieved in May 1979 in Fresno. It remained the Finnish record until 2001, when Timo Tompuri threw 69.62 m. In shot put his personal best of 20.03 metres, which he threw in August 1979, earned him entrance in the 20 meter club.

In a European Cup contest in 1977, Tuokko tested positive for doping, along with fellow Finns high jumper Asko Pesonen and javelin thrower Seppo Hovinen. He had a career in education after quitting professional sports.

See also
List of sportspeople sanctioned for doping offences

References

1951 births
2015 deaths
People from Seinäjoki
Finnish male shot putters
Finnish male discus throwers
Athletes (track and field) at the 1976 Summer Olympics
Athletes (track and field) at the 1980 Summer Olympics
Olympic athletes of Finland
Doping cases in athletics
Finnish sportspeople in doping cases
European Athletics Championships medalists
Universiade medalists in athletics (track and field)
Universiade gold medalists for Finland
Medalists at the 1975 Summer Universiade
Medalists at the 1979 Summer Universiade
Sportspeople from South Ostrobothnia
20th-century Finnish people
21st-century Finnish people